The CONCACAF Women's Olympic Qualifying Tournament was an international football (soccer) event in the North America, Central America and the Caribbean region, and was the qualification tournament for the Olympic Games.

Women's football tournaments in Olympics have been held since 1996, but the qualifying tournaments were held for the 2004 to 2020 Olympics, with the two finalists qualify for the Olympic tournament.

For the 2024 Summer Olympics the winner of the 2022 CONCACAF W Championship will qualify for the 2024 tournament, while the second and third-placed teams will advance to a CONCACAF Olympic play-off, where winner of the play-off will qualify for the Olympics.

Results
Flags indicate the hosts for the final rounds of the respective tournaments.(Q) indicates qualification to Olympics.

References

External links
CONCACAF Women's Olympic Qualifying
Results at soccerway.com

 
Football qualification for the Summer Olympics
Olympic Tournament